Das geheimnisvolle Wrack is an East German adventure film directed by . It was released in 1954.

Cast
 Kurt Ulrich as  Karl Drews
 Wilfried Ortmann as  Oberleutnant Herbert Fröhlich
 Hans-Hasso Steube as  Leutnant Gerhard Schrader
 Horst Naumann as  Unteroffizier Heinz Kersten
 Charlotte Küter as  Anna Röhrdanz
 Erika Dunkelmann as  Stine Drews
 Maria Besendahl as  Augustine Schmalz (as Anna-Maria Besendahl)
 Krista Körner as  Wittke Röhrdanz
 Alfred Maack as  Großvater Timm
 Paul Pfingst as  Älterer Grenzpolizist
 Heinz Laggies as  Maat Fritz Schütte
 Hans Neie as  Soldat Bruno Schulz
 Herwart Grosse as  Baron von Bleich
 Horst Preusker as  Hartmut Liebscher

External links
 

1954 films
1950s children's adventure films
German children's adventure films
East German films
1950s German-language films
German black-and-white films
Films set in the Baltic Sea
Films based on German novels
Films based on children's books
1950s German films